Rangamati (Bengali: রাঙ্গামাটি;) is the administrative headquarter and town of Rangamati Hill District in the Chittagong Hill Tracts of Bangladesh. The district is administered by an office named as District Administration, Rangamati.

From Chittagong a  road leads to Rangamati. The township is located on the western bank of the Kaptai lake. Rangamati is a holiday destination because of its landscape, scenic beauty, lake, indigenous groups (Chakma, Marma, Tripuri, Tanchangya, Pangkhua etc.), flora and fauna, indigenous museum, hanging bridge etc.

Tourist attractions
Rangamati is surrounded by natural features like as mountains, rivers, lakes, and waterfalls. Rangamati is also home to several ethnic groups. Some of the most popular attractions are:  
 Sajek Valley
 Kaptai Lake
 Konglak Haphong

Climate

Notable people
 Parijat Kusum Chakma
 Aung Shwe Prue Chowdhury
 Binoy Kumar Dewan
 Kamini Mohan Dewan
 Moni Swapan Dewan
 Subimal Dewan, advisor on Chittagong Hill Tracts affairs to President Ziaur Rahman, died in the College Gate area in 2009.
 Santu Larma
 Manabendra Narayan Larma
 Chaithoai Roaza
 Dipankar Talukdar
 Ushatan Talukder
 Shobha Rani Tripura

Gallery

References

.
Populated places in Chittagong Division
Towns in Bangladesh
Planned cities in Bangladesh